The Cultural Revolution, formally known as the Great Proletarian Cultural Revolution, was a sociopolitical movement in the People's Republic of China (PRC) launched by Mao Zedong in 1966, and lasting until his death in 1976. Its stated goal was to preserve Chinese communism by purging remnants of capitalist and traditional elements from Chinese society. The Revolution marked the effective commanding return of Mao –who was still the Chairman of the Chinese Communist Party (CCP)– to the centre of power, after a period of self-abstention and ceding to less radical leadership in the aftermath of the Mao-led Great Leap Forward debacle and the Great Chinese Famine (1959–1961). The Revolution failed to achieve its main goals.

Launching the movement in May 1966 with the help of the Cultural Revolution Group, Mao charged that bourgeois elements had infiltrated the government and society with the aim of restoring capitalism. Mao called on young people to "bombard the headquarters", and proclaimed that "to rebel is justified". The youth responded by forming various Red Guards around the country. A selection of Mao's sayings were compiled into the Little Red Book, which became a sacred text for Mao's personality cult. They held "denunciation rallies" against revisionists regularly, and grabbed power from local governments and CCP branches, eventually establishing the revolutionary committees in 1967. The committees often split into rival factions and became involved in armed fights known as "violent struggles", to which the army had to be sent to restore order. Mao declared the Revolution over in 1969, but the Revolution's active phase would last until at least 1971, when Lin Biao, accused of a botched coup against Mao, fled and died in a plane crash. In 1972, the Gang of Four rose to power and the Cultural Revolution continued until Mao's death and the arrest of the Gang of Four in 1976.

The Cultural Revolution was characterized by violence and chaos. Death toll claims vary widely, with estimates of those perishing during the Revolution ranging from hundreds of thousands to millions. Beginning with the Red August of Beijing, massacres took place nationwide, including the Guangxi Massacre, in which massive cannibalism also occurred; the Inner Mongolia incident; the Guangdong Massacre; the Yunnan Massacres; and the Hunan Massacres. Red Guards destroyed historical relics and artifacts, as well as ransacking cultural and religious sites. The 1975 Banqiao Dam failure, one of the world's greatest technological catastrophes, also occurred during the Cultural Revolution. Meanwhile, tens of millions of people were persecuted: senior officials, most notably Chinese president Liu Shaoqi, along with Deng Xiaoping, Peng Dehuai, and He Long, were purged or exiled; millions were accused of being members of the Five Black Categories, suffering public humiliation, imprisonment, torture, hard labor, seizure of property, and sometimes execution or harassment into suicide; intellectuals were considered the "Stinking Old Ninth" and were widely persecuted—notable scholars and scientists such as Lao She, Fu Lei, Yao Tongbin, and Zhao Jiuzhang were killed or committed suicide. Schools and universities were closed with the college entrance exams cancelled. Over 10 million urban intellectual youths were sent to the countryside in the Down to the Countryside Movement.

In December 1978, Deng Xiaoping became the new paramount leader of China, replacing Hua Guofeng, and started the "Boluan Fanzheng" program which gradually dismantled the Maoist policies associated with the Cultural Revolution, and brought the country back to order. Deng, together with his allies, then began a new phase in China, by initiating the historic Reforms and Opening-Up program. In 1981, the CCP declared and acknowledged that the Cultural Revolution was wrong and was "responsible for the most severe setback and the heaviest losses suffered by the people, the country, and the party since the founding of the People's Republic." In contemporary China, differing views exist about the Cultural Revolution. Among some, it is referred to as the "ten years of chaos".

Background

Great Leap Forward

In 1958, after China's first Five-Year Plan, Mao called for "grassroots socialism" in order to accelerate his plans for turning China into a modern industrialized state. In this spirit, Mao launched the Great Leap Forward, established People's Communes in the countryside, and began the mass mobilization of the people into collectives. Many communities were assigned production of a single commodity—steel. Mao vowed to increase agricultural production to twice that of 1957 levels.

The Great Leap was an economic failure. Many uneducated farmers were pulled from farming and harvesting and instead instructed to produce steel on a massive scale, partially relying on backyard furnaces to achieve the production targets set by local cadres. The steel produced was of low quality and mostly useless. The Great Leap reduced harvest sizes and led to a decline in the production of most goods except substandard pig iron and steel. Furthermore, local authorities frequently exaggerated production numbers, hiding and intensifying the problem for several years.

In the meantime, chaos in the collectives, bad weather, and exports of food necessary to secure hard currency resulted in the Great Chinese Famine. Food was in desperate shortage, and production fell dramatically. The famine caused the deaths of more than 30 million people, particularly in the more impoverished inland regions.

The Great Leap's failure reduced Mao's prestige within the CCP. Forced to take responsibility, in 1959, Mao resigned as the President of China, China's de jure head of state, and was succeeded by Liu Shaoqi, while Mao remained as Chairman of the Chinese Communist Party and Commander-in-chief. In July, senior Party leaders convened at the scenic Mount Lu to discuss policy. At the conference, Marshal Peng Dehuai, the Minister of Defence, criticized Great Leap policies in a private letter to Mao, writing that it was plagued by mismanagement and cautioning against elevating political dogma over the laws of economics.

Despite the moderate tone of Peng's letter, Mao took it as a personal attack against his leadership. Following the Conference, Mao had Peng removed from his posts, and accused him of being a "right-opportunist". Peng was replaced by Lin Biao, another revolutionary army general who became a more staunch Mao supporter later in his career. While the Lushan Conference served as a death knell for Peng, Mao's most vocal critic, it led to a shift of power to moderates led by Liu Shaoqi and Deng Xiaoping, who took effective control of the economy following 1959.

By the early 1960s, many of the Great Leap's economic policies were reversed by initiatives spearheaded by Liu, Deng, and Premier Zhou Enlai. This moderate group of pragmatists were unenthusiastic about Mao's utopian visions. By 1962, while Zhou, Liu and Deng managed affairs of state and the economy, Mao had effectively withdrawn from economic decision-making, and focused much of his time on further contemplating his contributions to Marxist–Leninist social theory, including the idea of "continuous revolution".

Sino-Soviet split and anti-revisionism

In the early 1950s, the People's Republic of China and the Soviet Union (USSR) were the two largest Communist states in the world. Although initially they had been mutually supportive, disagreements arose after the death of Joseph Stalin and the rise of Nikita Khrushchev to power in the Soviet Union. In 1956, Khrushchev denounced Stalin and his policies, and began implementing post-Stalinist economic reforms. Mao and many other members of the Chinese Communist Party (CCP) opposed these changes, believing that they would have negative repercussions for the worldwide Communist movement, among whom Stalin was still viewed as a hero.

Mao believed that Khrushchev did not adhere to Marxism–Leninism, but was instead a revisionist, altering his policies from basic Marxist–Leninist concepts, something Mao feared would allow capitalists to regain control of the country. Relations between the two governments soured. The USSR refused to support China's case for joining the United Nations and reneged on its pledge to supply China with a nuclear weapon.

Mao went on to publicly denounce revisionism in April 1960. Without pointing fingers at the Soviet Union, Mao criticized its ideological ally, the League of Communists of Yugoslavia. In turn, the USSR criticized China's ally the Party of Labour of Albania. In 1963, the CCP began to denounce the Soviet Union openly, publishing nine polemics against its perceived revisionism, with one of them being titled On Khrushchev's Phoney Communism and Historical Lessons for the World, in which Mao charged that Khrushchev was not only a revisionist but also increased the danger of capitalist restoration. Khrushchev's downfall from an internal coup d'état in 1964 also contributed to Mao's fears of his own political vulnerability, mainly because of his declining prestige among his colleagues after the Great Leap Forward.

Precursor 

In 1963, Mao launched the Socialist Education Movement, which is regarded as the precursor of the Cultural Revolution. Mao had set the scene for the Cultural Revolution by "cleansing" powerful officials of questionable loyalty who were based in Beijing. His approach was less than transparent, achieving this purge through newspaper articles, internal meetings, and by skillfully employing his network of political allies.

In late 1959, historian and Beijing Deputy Mayor Wu Han published a historical drama entitled Hai Rui Dismissed from Office. In the play, an honest civil servant, Hai Rui, is dismissed by a corrupt emperor. While Mao initially praised the play, in February 1965, he secretly commissioned his wife Jiang Qing and Shanghai propagandist Yao Wenyuan to publish an article criticizing it. Yao boldly alleged that Hai Rui was really an allegory attacking Mao; that is, Mao was the corrupt emperor, and Peng Dehuai was the honest civil servant.

Yao's article put Mayor of Beijing Peng Zhen on the defensive. Peng, a powerful official and Wu Han's direct superior, was the head of the "Five Man Group", a committee commissioned by Mao to study the potential for a cultural revolution. Peng Zhen, aware that he would be implicated if Wu indeed wrote an "anti-Mao" play, wished to contain Yao's influence. Yao's article was initially only published in select local newspapers. Peng forbade its publication in the nationally distributed People's Daily and other major newspapers under his control, instructing them to write exclusively about "academic discussion," and not pay heed to Yao's petty politics. While the "literary battle" against Peng raged, Mao fired Yang Shangkun—director of the CCP General Office, an organ that controlled internal communications—on a series of unsubstantiated charges, installing in his stead staunch loyalist Wang Dongxing, head of Mao's security detail. Yang's dismissal likely emboldened Mao's allies to move against their factional rivals.

In December, Defence Minister and Mao loyalist Lin Biao accused General Luo Ruiqing, the chief of staff of the PLA, of being anti-Mao, alleging that Luo put too much emphasis on military training rather than Maoist "political discussion." Despite initial skepticism in the Politburo Standing Committee of the Chinese Communist Party of Luo's guilt, Mao pushed for an 'investigation', after which Luo was denounced, dismissed, and forced to deliver a self-criticism. Stress from the events led Luo to attempt suicide. Luo's removal secured the military command's loyalty to Mao.

Having ousted Luo and Yang, Mao returned his attention to Peng Zhen. On February 12, 1966, the "Five Man Group" issued a report known as the February Outline. The Outline, sanctioned by the Party centre, defined Hai Rui as a constructive academic discussion and aimed to distance Peng Zhen formally from any political implications. However, Jiang Qing and Yao Wenyuan continued their denunciation of Wu Han and Peng Zhen. Meanwhile, Mao also sacked Propaganda Department director Lu Dingyi, a Peng Zhen ally.

Lu's removal gave Maoists unrestricted access to the press. Mao would deliver his final blow to Peng Zhen at a high-profile Politburo meeting through loyalists Kang Sheng and Chen Boda. They accused Peng Zhen of opposing Mao, labeled the February Outline "evidence of Peng Zhen's revisionism," and grouped him with three other disgraced officials as part of the "Peng-Luo-Lu-Yang Anti-Party Clique." On May 16, the Politburo formalized the decisions by releasing an official document condemning Peng Zhen and his "anti-party allies" in the strongest terms, disbanding his "Five Man Group", and replacing it with the Maoist Cultural Revolution Group (CRG).

History 
The history of the Cultural Revolution can generally be categorized into two main periods: (1) spring 1966 to summer 1968 (when most of the key events took place), and (2) a tailing period that lasted until fall 1976.

Early stage: mass movement (1966–68) 

The early phase of the Cultural Revolution was characterized by mass movement and political pluralization. Virtually anyone could create a political organization, with or without party approval. Known as Red Guards, these organizations originally arose in schools and universities and later arose in factories and other institutions. After 1968, most of these organizations ceased to exist and their legacies were a topic of intense controversy in the latter part of the Cultural Revolution.

May 16 Notification 

In May 1966, an "expanded session" of the Politburo of the Chinese Communist Party was called in Beijing. The conference, rather than being a joint discussion on policy (as per the usual norms of party operations), was mainly a campaign to mobilize the Politburo into endorsing Mao's political agenda. The conference was heavily laden with Maoist political rhetoric on class struggle and filled with meticulously prepared 'indictments' on the recently ousted leaders such as Peng Zhen and Luo Ruiqing. One of these documents, released on May 16, was prepared with Mao's personal supervision and was particularly damning:

Those representatives of the bourgeoisie who have sneaked into the Party, the government, the army, and various spheres of culture are a bunch of counter-revolutionary revisionists. Once conditions are ripe, they will seize political power and turn the dictatorship of the proletariat into a dictatorship of the bourgeoisie. Some of them we have already seen through; others we have not. Some are still trusted by us and are being trained as our successors, persons like Khrushchev for example, who are still nestling beside us.

This text, which became known as the "May 16 Notification", summarized Mao's ideological justification for the Cultural Revolution. Effectively it implied that there were enemies of the Communist cause within the Party itself: class enemies who "wave the red flag to oppose the red flag." The only way to identify these people was through "the telescope and microscope of Mao Zedong Thought." While the party leadership was relatively united in approving the general direction of Mao's agenda, many Politburo members were not especially enthusiastic, or simply confused about the direction of the movement. The charges against esteemed party leaders like Peng Zhen rang alarm bells in China's intellectual community and among the eight non-Communist parties.

Early mass rallies (May–June 1966) 

After the purge of Peng Zhen, the Beijing Party Committee had effectively ceased to function, paving the way for disorder in the capital. On May 25, under the guidance of —wife of Maoist henchman Kang Sheng—Nie Yuanzi, a philosophy lecturer at Peking University, authored a big-character poster along with other leftists and posted it to a public bulletin. Nie attacked the university's party administration and its leader Lu Ping. Nie insinuated that the university leadership, much like Peng Zhen, were trying to contain revolutionary fervour in a "sinister" attempt to oppose the party and advance revisionism.

Mao promptly endorsed Nie's dazibao as "the first Marxist big-character poster in China." Nie's call-to-arms, now sealed with Mao's personal stamp of approval, had a lasting ripple effect across all educational institutions in China. Students everywhere began to revolt against their respective schools' party establishment. Classes were promptly cancelled in Beijing primary and secondary schools, followed by a decision on June 13 to expand the class suspension nationwide. By early June, throngs of young demonstrators lined the capital's major thoroughfares holding giant portraits of Mao, beating drums, and shouting slogans against his perceived enemies.

When the dismissal of Peng Zhen and the municipal party leadership became public in early June, widespread confusion ensued. The public and foreign missions were kept in the dark on the reason for Peng Zhen's ousting. Even the top Party leadership was caught off guard by the sudden anti-establishment wave of protest and struggled with what to do next. After seeking Mao's guidance in Hangzhou, Liu Shaoqi and Deng Xiaoping decided to send in 'work teams'—effectively 'ideological-guidance' squads of cadres—to the city's schools and People's Daily to restore some semblance of order and re-establish party control.

The work teams were hastily dispatched and had a poor understanding of student sentiment. Unlike the political movement of the 1950s that squarely targeted intellectuals, the new movement was focused on established party cadres, many of whom were part of the work teams. As a result, the work teams came under increasing suspicion for being yet another group aimed at thwarting revolutionary fervour. The party leadership subsequently became divided over whether or not work teams should remain in place. Liu Shaoqi insisted on continuing work-team involvement and suppressing the movement's most radical elements, fearing that the movement would spin out of control.

"Bombard the headquarters" (July 1966)

On July 16, the 72-year-old Chairman Mao took to the Yangtze River in Wuhan, with the press in tow, in what became an iconic "swim across the Yangtze" to demonstrate his battle-readiness. He subsequently returned to Beijing on a mission to criticize the party leadership for its handling of the work-teams issue. Mao accused the work teams of undermining the student movement, calling for their full withdrawal on July 24. Several days later a rally was held at the Great Hall of the People to announce the decision and set the new tone of the movement to university and high school teachers and students. At the rally, Party leaders told the masses assembled to 'not be afraid' and bravely take charge of the movement themselves, free of Party interference.

The work-teams issue marked a decisive defeat for President Liu Shaoqi politically; it also signaled that disagreement over how to handle the unfolding events of the Cultural Revolution would break Mao from the established party leadership irreversibly. On August 1, the Eleventh Plenum of the 8th Central Committee of the Chinese Communist Party was hastily convened to advance Mao's now decidedly radical agenda. At the plenum, Mao showed outright disdain for Liu, repeatedly interrupting Liu as he delivered his opening day speech.

For several days, Mao repeatedly insinuated that the CCP's leadership had contravened his revolutionary vision. Mao's line of thinking received a lukewarm reception from the conference attendees. Sensing that the largely obstructive party elite was unwilling to embrace his revolutionary ideology on a full scale, Mao went on the offensive.

On July 28, Red Guard representatives wrote to Mao, calling for rebellion and upheaval to safeguard the revolution. Mao then responded to the letters by writing his own big-character poster entitled Bombard the Headquarters, rallying people to target the "command centre (i.e., Headquarters) of counterrevolution." Mao wrote that despite having undergone a Communist revolution, a "bourgeois" elite was still thriving in "positions of authority" in the government and Communist Party.

Although no names were mentioned, this provocative statement by Mao has been interpreted as a direct indictment of the party establishment under Liu Shaoqi and Deng Xiaoping—the purported "bourgeois headquarters" of China. The personnel changes at the Plenum reflected a radical re-design of the party's hierarchy to suit this new ideological landscape. Liu and Deng kept their seats on the Politburo Standing Committee but were in fact sidelined from day-to-day party affairs. Lin Biao was elevated to become the CCP's number-two figure; Liu Shaoqi's rank went from second to eighth and was no longer Mao's heir apparent.

Coinciding with the top leadership being thrown out of positions of power was the thorough undoing of the entire national bureaucracy of the Communist Party. The extensive Organization Department, in charge of party personnel, virtually ceased to exist. The Cultural Revolution Group (CRG), Mao's ideological 'Praetorian Guard', was catapulted to prominence to propagate his ideology and rally popular support. The top officials in the Propaganda Department were sacked, with many of its functions folding into the CRG.

Red August and the Sixteen Points (August 1966) 

The Little Red Book (Mao's Quotations) was the mechanism that led the Red Guards to commit to their objective as the future for China. These quotes directly from Mao led to other actions by the Red Guards in the views of other Maoist leaders, and by December 1967, 350-million copies of the book had been printed. Quotations in the Little Red Book that the Red Guards would later follow as a guide, provided by Mao, included:

Every Communist must grasp the truth, "Political power grows out of the barrel of a gun."

Revolutionary war is an antitoxin which not only eliminates the enemy's poison but also purges us of our filth. Every just, revolutionary war is endowed with tremendous power and can transform many things or clear the way for their transformation. The Sino-Japanese war will transform both China and Japan; Provided China perseveres in the War of Resistance and in the united front, the old Japan will surely be transformed into a new Japan and the old China into a new China, and people and everything else in both China and Japan will be transformed during and after the war.

The world is yours, as well as ours, but in the last analysis, it is yours. You young people, full of vigor and vitality, are in the bloom of life, like the sun at eight or nine in the morning. Our hope is placed on you ... The world belongs to you. China's future belongs to you.During the Red August of Beijing, on August 8, 1966, the Central Committee of the Chinese Communist Party passed its "Decision Concerning the Great Proletarian Cultural Revolution," later to be known as the "Sixteen Points." This decision defined the Cultural Revolution as "a great revolution that touches people to their very souls and constitutes a deeper and more extensive stage in the development of the socialist revolution in our country:"Although the bourgeoisie has been overthrown, it is still trying to use the old ideas, culture, customs, and habits of the exploiting classes to corrupt the masses, capture their minds, and stage a comeback. The proletariat must do just the opposite: It must meet head-on every challenge of the bourgeoisie ... to change the outlook of society. Currently, our objective is to struggle against and crush those people in authority who are taking the capitalist road, to criticize and repudiate the reactionary bourgeois academic "authorities" and the ideology of the bourgeoisie and all other exploiting classes and to transform education, literature and art, and all other parts of the superstructure that do not correspond to the socialist economic base, so as to facilitate the consolidation and development of the socialist system.
The implications of the Sixteen Points were far-reaching. It elevated what was previously a student movement to a nationwide mass campaign that would galvanize workers, farmers, soldiers and lower-level party functionaries to rise, challenge authority, and re-shape the "superstructure" of society.

During the Red August of Beijing, on August 18, 1966, over a million Red Guards from all over the country gathered in and around Tiananmen Square in Beijing for a personal audience with the chairman. Mao personally mingled with Red Guards and encouraged their motivation, donning a Red Guard armband himself. Lin Biao also took centre stage at the August 18 rally, vociferously denouncing all manner of perceived enemies in Chinese society that were impeding the "progress of the revolution." Subsequently, violence significantly escalated in Beijing and quickly spread to other areas of China.

On August 22, 1966, a central directive was issued to stop police intervention in Red Guard activities, and those in the police force who defied this notice were labeled counter-revolutionaries. Mao's praise for rebellion encouraged actions of the Red Guards. Central officials lifted restraints on violent behavior in support of the revolution. Xie Fuzhi, the national police chief, often pardoned Red Guards for their "crimes." In about two weeks, the violence left some 100 officials of the ruling and middle class dead in Beijing's western district alone. The number injured exceeded that.

The most violent aspects of the campaign included incidents of torture, murder, and public humiliation. Many people who were indicted as counter-revolutionaries died by suicide. During the Red August 1966, in Beijing alone 1,772 people were murdered, many of the victims were teachers who were attacked and even killed by their own students. In Shanghai, there were 704 suicides and 534 deaths related to the Cultural Revolution in September. In Wuhan, there were 62 suicides and 32 murders during the same period. Peng Dehuai was brought to Beijing to be publicly ridiculed.

Destruction of the Four Olds 

Between August and November 1966, eight mass rallies were held in which over 12 million people from all over the country, most of whom were Red Guards, participated. The government bore the expenses of Red Guards travelling around the country exchanging "revolutionary experiences".

At the Red Guard rallies, Lin Biao also called for the destruction of the "Four Olds"; namely, old customs, culture, habits, and ideas. A revolutionary fever swept the country by storm, with Red Guards acting as its most prominent warriors. Some changes associated with the "Four Olds" campaign were mainly benign, such as assigning new names to city streets, places, and even people; millions of babies were born with "revolutionary"-sounding names during this period.

Other aspects of Red Guard activities were more destructive, particularly in the realms of culture and religion. Various historical sites throughout the country were destroyed. The damage was particularly pronounced in the capital, Beijing. Red Guards also laid siege to the Temple of Confucius in Shandong province, and numerous other historically significant tombs and artifacts.

Libraries full of historical and foreign texts were destroyed; books were burned. Temples, churches, mosques, monasteries, and cemeteries were closed down and sometimes converted to other uses, looted, and destroyed. Marxist propaganda depicted Buddhism as superstition, and religion was looked upon as a means of hostile foreign infiltration, as well as an instrument of the ruling class. Clergy were arrested and sent to camps; many Tibetan Buddhists were forced to participate in the destruction of their monasteries at gunpoint.

Central Work Conference (October 1966) 
In October 1966, Mao convened a "Central Work Conference", mostly to convince those in the party leadership who had not yet adopted revolutionary ideology. Liu Shaoqi and Deng Xiaoping were prosecuted as part of a bourgeois reactionary line (资产阶级反动路线; zichanjieji fandong luxian) and begrudgingly gave self-criticisms. After the conference, Liu, once a powerful moderate pundit of the ruling class, was placed under house arrest in Beijing, then sent to a detention camp, where he was denied medical treatment and died in 1969. Deng Xiaoping was sent away for a period of re-education three times and was eventually sent to work in an engine factory in Jiangxi province. Rebellion by party cadres accelerated after the conference.

Radicals seized power (1967)

Mass organisations in China coalesced into two hostile factions, the radicals who backed Mao's purge of the Communist party, and the conservatives who backed the moderate party establishment. The "support the left" policy was established in late January 1967. As conceived by Mao, the policy was intended to support the rebels in seizing power; it required the People's Liberation Army (PLA) to support "the broad mases of the revolutionary leftists in their struggle to seize power."

In March 1967, the policy was adapted into the "Three Supports and Two Militaries"—support the left, support the workers, support the peasants, and military control and military training. The policy of supporting the left was flawed from inception by its failure to define "leftists" at a time when almost all mass organizations claimed to be "leftist" or "revolutionary." The PLA commanders had developed close working relations with the party establishment, many military units worked to repress radicals.

Spurred by the events in Beijing, 'power seizure' (duoquan) groups formed all over the country and began expanding into factories and the countryside. In Shanghai, a young factory worker named Wang Hongwen organized a far-reaching revolutionary coalition, one that galvanized and displaced existing Red Guard groups. On January 3, 1967, with support from CRG heavyweights Zhang Chunqiao and Yao Wenyuan, the group of firebrand activists overthrew the Shanghai municipal government under Chen Pixian in what became known as the "January Storm," and formed in its place the Shanghai People's Commune.

Shanghai's was the first provincial level government overthrown. Within days, Mao expressed his approval. Provincial governments and many parts of the state and party bureaucracy were affected, with power seizures taking place in a remarkably different fashion. In the next three weeks, 24 more province-level governments were overthrown. Revolutionary committees were subsequently established, in place of local governments and branches of the Communist Party. For example, in Beijing, three separate revolutionary groups declared power seizures on the same day, while in Heilongjiang, the local party secretary Pan Fusheng managed to "seize power" from the party organization under his own leadership. Some leaders even wrote the CRG asking to be overthrown.

In Beijing, Jiang Qing and Zhang Chunqiao made a target out of Vice-Premier Tao Zhu. The power-seizure movement was rearing its head in the military as well. In February, prominent generals Ye Jianying and Chen Yi, as well as Vice-Premier Tan Zhenlin, vocally asserted their opposition to the more extreme aspects of the movement, with some party elders insinuating that the CRG's real motives were to remove the revolutionary old guard. Mao, initially ambivalent, took to the Politburo floor on February 18 to denounce the opposition directly, giving a full-throated endorsement to the radicals' activities. This short-lived resistance was branded the "February Countercurrent"—effectively silencing critics of the movement within the party in the years to come.

Although in early 1967 popular insurgencies were still limited outside of the biggest cities, local governments nonetheless began collapsing all across China. While revolutionaries dismantled ruling government and party organizations all over the country, because power seizures lacked centralized leadership, it was no longer clear who truly believed in Mao's revolutionary vision and who was opportunistically exploiting the chaos for their own gain. The formation of rival revolutionary groups, some manifestations of long-established local feuds, led to factional violent struggles across the country. Tension grew between mass organizations and the military as well. In response, Lin Biao issued a directive for the army to aid the radicals. At the same time, the army took control of some provinces and locales that were deemed incapable of sorting out their own power transitions.

In the central city of Wuhan, like in many other cities, two major revolutionary organizations emerged, one supporting the conservative establishment and the other opposed to it. The groups fought over the control of the city. Chen Zaidao, the Army general in charge of the area, forcibly repressed the anti-establishment demonstrators who were backed by Mao. However, during the commotion, Mao himself flew to Wuhan with a large entourage of central officials in an attempt to secure military loyalty in the area. On July 20, 1967, local agitators in response kidnapped Mao's emissary Wang Li in what became known as the Wuhan Incident. Subsequently, Gen. Chen Zaidao was sent to Beijing and tried by Jiang Qing and the rest of the Cultural Revolution Group. Chen's resistance was the last major open display of opposition to the movement within the PLA.

The Gang of Four's Zhang Chunqiao, admitted that the most crucial factor in the Cultural Revolution was not the Red Guards or the Cultural Revolution Group or the "rebel worker" organisations, but the side on which the PLA stood. When the PLA local garrison supported Mao's radicals, they were able to take over the local government successfully, but if they were not cooperative, the seizures of power were unsuccessful. Violent clashes occurred in virtually all cities, according to one historian.

In response to the Wuhan Incident, Mao and Jiang Qing began establishing a "workers' armed self-defence force", a "revolutionary armed force of mass character" to counter what he estimated as rightism in "75% of the PLA officer corps." Chongqing city, a center of arms manufacturing, was the site of ferocious armed clashes between the two factions, with one construction site in the city estimated to involve 10,000 combatants with tanks, mobile artillery, anti-aircraft guns and "virtually every kind of conventional weapon." Ten thousand artillery shells were fired in Chongqing during August 1967.

Nationwide, a total of 18.77 million firearms, 14,828 artillery pieces, 2,719,545 grenades ended up in civilian hands. They were used in the course of violent struggles ,which mostly took place from 1967 to 1968. In the cities of Chongqing, Xiamen, and Changchun, tanks, armoured vehicles and even warships were deployed in combat.

Cleansing the Class Ranks (May–Sept. 1968) 

In May 1968, Mao launched the massive "Cleansing the Class Ranks" political purge in mainland China. Many were sent to the countryside to work in reeducation camps.

On July 27, 1968, the Red Guards' power over the PLA was officially ended, and the establishment government sent in units to besiege areas that remained untouched by the Guards. A year later, the Red Guard factions were dismantled entirely; Mao predicted that the chaos might begin running its own agenda and be tempted to turn against revolutionary ideology. Their purpose had been largely fulfilled; Mao and his radical colleagues had largely overturned establishment power.

Liu was expelled from the CCP at the 12th Plenum of the Eighth Central Committee in September 1968, and labelled the "headquarters of the bourgeoisie," seemingly alluding to Mao's Bombard the Headquarters dazibao written two years earlier.

Mao's meeting with student Red Guard leaders (July 1968) 
As the Red Guard movement had waned over the course of the preceding year, violence by the remaining militant Red Guards increased on some Beijing campuses. Violence was particularly pronounced at Qinghua University, where a few thousand hardliners of two different factions continued to fight. At Mao's initiative, on July 27, 1968, tens of thousands of workers entered the Qinghua campus shouting slogans in opposition to the violence. Red Guards attacked the workers, who continued to remain peaceful. Ultimately, the workers disarmed the students and occupied the campus.

On July 28, 1968, Mao and the Central Group for the Cultural Revolution met with the five most important remaining Beijing Red Guard leaders to address the movement's excessive violence and political exhaustion. It was the only time during the Cultural Revolution that Mao met and addressed the student leaders directly. In response to a Red Guard leader's telegram sent prior to the meeting, which claimed that some "Black Hand" had maneuvered the workers against the Red Guards to suppress the Cultural Revolution, Mao told the student leaders, "The Black Hand is nobody else but me! ... I asked [the workers] how to solve the armed fighting in the universities, and told them to go there to have a look."

During the meeting, Mao and the Central Group for the Cultural Revolution stated, "[W]e want cultural struggle, we do not want armed struggle" and "The masses do not want civil war." Mao told the student leaders:

"Mango fever" and Mao's cult of personality (August 1968)

In the spring of 1968, a massive campaign that aimed at enhancing Mao's reputation began. A notable example was the "mango fever." On August 4, 1968, Mao was presented with about 40 mangoes by the Pakistani foreign minister, Syed Sharifuddin Pirzada, in an apparent diplomatic gesture. Mao had his aide send the box of mangoes to his Mao Zedong Propaganda Team at Tsinghua University on August 5, the team stationed there to quiet strife among Red Guard factions. On August 7, an article was published in the People's Daily saying:

In the afternoon of the fifth, when the great happy news of Chairman Mao giving mangoes to the Capital Worker and Peasant Mao Zedong Thought Propaganda Team reached the Tsinghua University campus, people immediately gathered around the gift given by the Great Leader Chairman Mao. They cried out enthusiastically and sang with wild abandonment. Tears swelled up in their eyes, and they again and again sincerely wished that our most beloved Great Leader lived ten thousand years without bounds ... They all made phone calls to their own work units to spread this happy news; and they also organised all kinds of celebratory activities all night long, and arrived at [the national leadership compound] Zhongnanhai despite the rain to report the good news, and to express their loyalty to the Great Leader Chairman Mao.

Subsequent articles were also written by government officials propagandizing the reception of the mangoes, and another poem in the People's Daily said: "Seeing that golden mango/Was as if seeing the great leader Chairman Mao ... Again and again touching that golden mango/the golden mango was so warm." Few people at this time in China had ever seen a mango before, and a mango was seen as "a fruit of extreme rarity, like Mushrooms of Immortality."

One of the mangoes was sent to the Beijing Textile Factory, whose revolutionary committee organised a rally in the mangoes' honour. Workers read out quotations from Mao and celebrated the gift. Altars were erected to display the fruit prominently. When the mango peel began to rot after a few days, the fruit was peeled and boiled in a pot of water. Workers then filed by and each was given a spoonful of mango water. The revolutionary committee also made a wax replica of the mango and displayed this as a centrepiece in the factory.

There followed several months of "mango fever," as the fruit became a focus of a "boundless loyalty" campaign for Chairman Mao. More replica mangoes were created, and the replicas were sent on tour around Beijing and elsewhere in China. Many revolutionary committees visited the mangoes in Beijing from outlying provinces. Approximately half a million people greeted the replicas when they arrived in Chengdu. Badges and wall posters featuring the mangoes and Mao were produced in the millions.

The fruit was shared among all institutions that had been a part of the propaganda team, and large processions were organised in support of the zhengui lipin  or 珍贵礼品 ("precious gift"), as the mangoes were known. One dentist in a small town, Dr. Han, saw the mango and said it was nothing special and looked just like sweet potato. He was put on trial for malicious slander, found guilty, paraded publicly throughout the town, and then executed with one shot to the head.

It has been claimed that Mao used the mangoes to express support for the workers who would go to whatever lengths necessary to end the factional fighting among students, and a "prime example of Mao's strategy of symbolic support." Even up until early 1969, participants of Mao-Zedong-Thought study classes in Beijing would return with mass-produced mango facsimiles and still gain media attention in the provinces.

Down to the Countryside Movement (December 1968) 

In December 1968, Mao began the "Down to the Countryside Movement." During this movement, which lasted for the next decade, young bourgeoisie living in cities were ordered to go to the countryside to experience working life. The term "young intellectuals" was used to refer to recently graduated college students. In the late 1970s, these students returned to their home cities. Many students who were previously Red Guard members supported the movement and Mao's vision. This movement was thus in part a means of moving Red Guards from the cities to the countryside, where they would cause less social disruption. It also served to spread revolutionary ideology across China geographically.

Lin Biao phase (1969–71)

Transition of power (April 1969)
The 9th National Congress of the Chinese Communist Party was held in April 1969 and served as a means to "revitalize" the party with fresh thinking and new cadres after much of the old guard had been destroyed in the struggles of preceding years. The institutional framework of the Party established two decades earlier had broken down almost entirely: delegates for this Congress were effectively selected by Revolutionary Committees rather than through election by party members. Representation of the military increased by a large margin from the previous Congress (28% of the delegates were PLA members), and the election of more PLA members to the new Central Committee reflected this increase. Many military officers elevated to senior positions were loyal to PLA Marshal Lin Biao, opening a new factional divide between the military and civilian leadership.

Lin Biao was officially elevated to become the Party's number-two figure, with his name written into the CCP's Constitution as Mao's "closest comrade-in-arms" and "universally recognized successor." At the time, no other Communist parties or governments anywhere in the world had adopted the practice of enshrining a successor to the current leader into their constitutions; this practice was unique to China. Lin delivered the keynote address at the Congress: a document drafted by hardliner leftists Yao Wenyuan and Zhang Chunqiao under Mao's guidance.

The report was heavily critical of Liu Shaoqi and other "counter-revolutionaries" and drew extensively from quotations in the Little Red Book. The Congress solidified the central role of Maoism within the party psyche, re-introducing Maoism as an official guiding ideology of the party in the party constitution. Lastly, the Congress elected a new Politburo with Mao Zedong, Lin Biao, Chen Boda, Zhou Enlai and Kang Sheng as the members of the new Politburo Standing Committee.

Lin, Chen and Kang were all beneficiaries of the Cultural Revolution. Zhou, who was demoted in rank, voiced his unequivocal support for Lin at the Congress. Mao also restored the function of some formal party institutions, such as the operations of the party's Politburo, which ceased functioning between 1966 and 1968 because the Central Cultural Revolution Group held de facto control of the country.

PLA gains pre-eminent role (1970)

Mao's efforts at re-organizing party and state institutions generated mixed results. Many far-flung provinces remained volatile as the political situation in Beijing stabilized. Factional struggles, many of which were violent, continued at the local level despite the declaration that the 9th National Congress of the Chinese Communist Party marked a temporary "victory" for the Cultural Revolution. Furthermore, despite Mao's efforts to put on a show of unity at the Congress, the factional divide between Lin Biao's PLA camp and the Jiang Qing-led radical camp was intensifying. Indeed, a personal dislike of Jiang Qing drew many civilian leaders, including prominent theoretician Chen Boda, closer to Lin Biao.

Between 1966 and 1968, China was isolated internationally, having declared its enmity towards both the Soviet Union and the United States. The friction with the Soviet Union intensified after border clashes on the Ussuri River in March 1969 as the Chinese leadership prepared for all-out war. In October, senior leaders were evacuated from Beijing. Amidst the tension, Lin Biao issued what appeared to be an executive order to prepare for war to the PLA's eleven Military Regions on October 18 without passing through Mao. This drew the ire of the chairman, who saw it as evidence that his authority was prematurely usurped by his declared successor.

The prospect of war elevated the PLA to greater prominence in domestic politics, increasing the stature of Lin Biao at the expense of Mao. There is some evidence to suggest that Mao was pushed to seek closer relations with the United States as a means to avoid PLA dominance in domestic affairs that would result from a military confrontation with the Soviet Union. During his meeting with U.S. President Richard Nixon in 1972, Mao hinted that Lin had opposed seeking better relations with the U.S.

Restoration of Presidency (State Chairman) 
After Lin was confirmed as Mao's successor, his supporters focused on the restoration of the position of State Chairman (President), which had been abolished by Mao after the purge of Liu Shaoqi. They hoped that by allowing Lin to ease into a constitutionally sanctioned role, whether Chairman or vice-chairman, Lin's succession would be institutionalized. The consensus within the CCP Politburo was that Mao should assume the office with Lin becoming vice-chairman; but perhaps wary of Lin's ambitions or for other unknown reasons, Mao had voiced his explicit opposition to the recreation of the position and his assuming it.

Factional rivalries intensified at the Second Plenum of the Ninth Congress in Lushan held in late August 1970. Chen Boda, now aligned with the PLA faction loyal to Lin, galvanized support for the restoration of the office of President of China, despite Mao's wishes to the contrary. Moreover, Chen launched an assault on Zhang Chunqiao, a staunch Maoist who embodied the chaos of the Cultural Revolution, over the evaluation of Mao's legacy.

The attacks on Zhang found favour with many attendees at the Plenum and may have been construed by Mao as an indirect attack on the Cultural Revolution itself. Mao confronted Chen openly, denouncing him as a "false Marxist," and removed him from the Politburo Standing Committee. In addition to the purge of Chen, Mao asked Lin's principal generals to write self-criticisms on their political positions as a warning to Lin. Mao also inducted several of his supporters to the Central Military Commission and placed his loyalists in leadership roles of the Beijing Military Region.

Flight of Lin Biao (September 1971)

By 1971, diverging interests between the civilian and military wings of the leadership were apparent. Mao was troubled by the PLA's newfound prominence, and the purge of Chen Boda marked the beginning of a gradual scaling-down of the PLA's political involvement. According to official sources, sensing the reduction of Lin's power base and his declining health, Lin's supporters plotted to use the military power still at their disposal to oust Mao in a coup.

Lin's son, Lin Liguo, and other high-ranking military conspirators formed a coup apparatus in Shanghai and dubbed the plan to oust Mao by force Outline for Project 571, which sounds similar to "Military Uprising" in Mandarin. It is disputed whether Lin Biao was involved in this process. While official sources maintain that Lin planned and executed the alleged coup attempt, scholars such as Jin Qiu portray Lin as a passive character manipulated by members of his family and his supporters. Qiu contests that Lin Biao was never personally involved in drafting the Outline and evidence suggests that Lin Liguo drafted the coup.

The Outline allegedly consisted mainly of plans for aerial bombardments through use of the Air Force. It initially targeted Zhang Chunqiao and Yao Wenyuan, but would later involve Mao himself. If the plan succeeded, Lin would arrest his political rivals and assume power. Assassination attempts were alleged to have been made against Mao in Shanghai, from September 8 to 10, 1971. Perceived risks to Mao's safety were allegedly relayed to the chairman. One internal report alleged that Lin had planned to bomb a bridge that Mao was to cross to reach Beijing; Mao reportedly avoided this bridge after receiving intelligence reports.

Death of Lin Biao 
In the official narrative, on September 13, 1971, Lin Biao, his wife Ye Qun, Lin Liguo, and members of his staff attempted to flee to the Soviet Union ostensibly to seek asylum. En route, Lin's plane crashed in Mongolia, killing all on board. The plane apparently ran out of fuel en route to the Soviet Union. A Soviet team investigating the incident was not able to determine the cause of the crash but hypothesized that the pilot was flying low to evade radar and misjudged the plane's altitude.

The official account has been put to question by foreign scholars, who have raised doubts over Lin's choice of the Soviet Union as a destination, the plane's route, the identity of the passengers, and whether or not a coup was actually taking place.

On September 13, the Politburo met in an emergency session to discuss Lin Biao. Only on September 30 was Lin's death confirmed in Beijing, which led to the cancellation of the National Day celebration events the following day. The Central Committee kept information under wraps, and news of Lin's death was not released to the public until two months following the incident. Many of Lin's supporters sought refuge in Hong Kong. Those who remained on the mainland were purged.

The event caught the party leadership off guard: the concept that Lin could betray Mao de-legitimized a vast body of Cultural Revolution political rhetoric and by extension, Mao's absolute authority, as Lin was already enshrined into the Party Constitution as Mao's "closest comrade-in-arms" and "successor." For several months following the incident, the party information apparatus struggled to find a "correct way" to frame the incident for public consumption, but as the details came to light, the majority of the Chinese public felt disillusioned and realised they had been manipulated for political purposes.

"Gang of Four" phase (1972–76)

Antagonism towards Zhou and Deng (1972–73)

Mao became depressed and reclusive after the Lin Biao incident. With Lin gone, Mao had no ready answers for who would succeed him. Sensing a sudden loss of direction, Mao attempted reaching out to old comrades whom he had denounced in the past. Meanwhile, in September 1972, Mao transferred a 38-year-old cadre from Shanghai, Wang Hongwen, to Beijing and made him vice-chairman of the Party. Wang, a former factory worker from a peasant background, was seemingly being groomed for succession.

Jiang Qing's position also strengthened after Lin's flight. She held tremendous influence with the radical camp. With Mao's health on the decline, it was clear that Jiang Qing had political ambitions of her own. She allied herself with Wang Hongwen and propaganda specialists Zhang Chunqiao and Yao Wenyuan, forming a political clique later pejoratively dubbed as the "Gang of Four".

By 1973, round after round of political struggles had left many lower-level institutions, including local government, factories, and railways, short of competent staff needed to carry out basic functions. China's economy had fallen into disarray, which necessitated the rehabilitation of purged lower-level officials. The party's core became heavily dominated by Cultural Revolution beneficiaries and leftist radicals, whose focus remained to uphold ideological purity over economic productivity. The economy remained the domain of Zhou Enlai mostly, one of the few moderates 'left standing'. Zhou attempted to restore a viable economy but was resented by the Gang of Four, who identified him as their primary political threat in post-Mao era succession.

In late 1973, to weaken Zhou's political position and to distance themselves from Lin's apparent betrayal, the "Criticize Lin, Criticize Confucius" campaign began under Jiang Qing's leadership. Its stated goals were to purge China of new Confucianist thinking and denounce Lin Biao's actions as traitorous and regressive. Reminiscent of the first years of the Cultural Revolution, the battle was carried out through historical allegory, and although Zhou Enlai's name was never mentioned during this campaign, the Premier's historical namesake, the Duke of Zhou, was a frequent target.

Deng's rehabilitation and economic reconstruction (1975) 
With a fragile economy and Zhou falling ill to cancer, Deng Xiaoping returned to the political scene, taking up the post of Vice-Premier in March 1973, in the first of a series of promotions approved by Mao. After Zhou withdrew from active politics in January 1975, Deng was effectively put in charge of the government, party, and military, earning the additional titles of PLA General Chief of Staff, Vice-chairman of the Communist Party, and vice-chairman of the Central Military Commission in a short time span.

The speed of Deng's rehabilitation took the radical camp, who saw themselves as Mao's 'rightful' political and ideological heirs, by surprise. Mao wanted to use Deng as a counterweight to the military faction in government to suppress any remaining influence of those formerly loyal to Lin Biao. In addition, Mao had also lost confidence in the ability of the Gang of Four to manage the economy and saw Deng as a competent and effective leader. Leaving the country in grinding poverty would do no favours to the positive legacy of the Cultural Revolution, which Mao worked hard to protect. Deng's return set the scene for a protracted factional struggle between the radical Gang of Four and moderates led by Zhou and Deng.

At the time, Jiang Qing and associates held effective control of mass media and the party's propaganda network, while Zhou and Deng held control of most government organs. On some decisions, Mao sought to mitigate the Gang's influence, but on others, he acquiesced to their demands. The Gang of Four's heavy hand in political and media control did not prevent Deng from reinstating his economic policies. Deng emphatically opposed Party factionalism, and his policies aimed to promote unity as the first step to restoring economic productivity.

Much like the post-Great Leap restructuring led by Liu Shaoqi, Deng streamlined the railway system, steel production, and other vital areas of the economy. By late 1975, however, Mao saw that Deng's economic restructuring might negate the legacy of the Cultural Revolution, and launched a campaign to oppose "rehabilitating the case for the rightists," alluding to Deng as the country's foremost "rightist." Mao directed Deng to write self-criticisms in November 1975, a move lauded by the Gang of Four.

Death of Zhou Enlai (early 1976)
On January 8, 1976, Zhou Enlai died of bladder cancer. On January 15 Deng Xiaoping delivered Zhou's official eulogy in a funeral attended by all of China's most senior leaders with the notable absence of Mao himself, who had grown increasingly critical of Zhou. After Zhou's death, Mao selected neither a member of the Gang of Four nor Deng to become Premier, instead choosing the relatively unknown Hua Guofeng.

The Gang of Four grew apprehensive that spontaneous, large-scale popular support for Zhou could turn the political tide against them. They acted through the media to impose a set of restrictions on overt public displays of mourning for Zhou. Years of resentment over the Cultural Revolution, the public persecution of Deng Xiaoping (seen as Zhou's ally), and the prohibition against public mourning led to a rise in popular discontent against Mao and the Gang of Four.

Official attempts to enforce the mourning restrictions included removing public memorials and tearing down posters commemorating Zhou's achievements. On March 25, 1976, Shanghai's Wen Hui Bao published an article calling Zhou "the capitalist roader inside the Party [who] wanted to help the unrepentant capitalist roader [Deng] regain his power." These propaganda efforts at smearing Zhou's image, however, only strengthened public attachment to Zhou's memory.

Tiananmen Incident (Apr. 1976)

On April 4, 1976, on the eve of China's annual Qingming Festival, a traditional day of mourning, thousands of people gathered around the Monument to the People's Heroes in Tiananmen Square to commemorate Zhou Enlai. The people of Beijing honored Zhou by laying wreaths, banners, poems, placards, and flowers at the foot of the Monument. The most apparent purpose of this memorial was to eulogize Zhou, but the Gang of Four were also attacked for their actions against the Premier. A small number of slogans left at Tiananmen even attacked Mao himself, and his Cultural Revolution.

Up to two million people may have visited Tiananmen Square on April 4. All levels of society, from the most impoverished peasants to high-ranking PLA officers and the children of high-ranking cadres, were represented in the activities. Those who participated were motivated by a mixture of anger over the treatment of Zhou, revolt against the Cultural Revolution and apprehension for China's future. The event did not appear to have coordinated leadership but rather seemed to be a reflection of public sentiment.

The Central Committee, under the leadership of Jiang Qing, labelled the event 'counter-revolutionary' and cleared the square of memorial items shortly after midnight on April 6. Attempts to suppress the mourners led to a violent riot. Police cars were set on fire, and a crowd of over 100,000 people forced its way into several government buildings surrounding the square. Many of those arrested were later sentenced to prison. Similar incidents occurred in other major cities. Jiang Qing and her allies pinned Deng Xiaoping as the incident's 'mastermind', and issued reports on official media to that effect. Deng was formally stripped of all positions "inside and outside the Party" on April 7. This marked Deng's second purge in ten years.

Death of Mao and Arrest of the Gang of Four (Sept. 1976)

On September 9, 1976, Mao Zedong died. To Mao's supporters, his death symbolized the loss of the revolutionary foundation of Communist China. When his death was announced on the afternoon of September 9, in a press release entitled "A Notice from the Central Committee, the NPC, State Council, and the CMC to the whole Party, the whole Army and to the people of all nationalities throughout the country," the nation descended into grief and mourning, with people weeping in the streets and public institutions closing for over a week. Hua Guofeng chaired the Funeral Committee and delivered the memorial speech.

Shortly before dying, Mao had allegedly written the message "With you in charge, I'm at ease," to Hua. Hua used this message to substantiate his position as successor. Hua had been widely considered to be lacking in political skill and ambitions, and seemingly posed no serious threat to the Gang of Four in the race for succession. However, the Gang's radical ideas also clashed with influential elders and a large segment of party reformers. With army backing and the support of Marshal Ye Jianying, on October 6, the Special Unit 8341 had all members of the Gang of Four arrested in a bloodless coup.

Aftermath

Transition period 
Although Hua Guofeng publicly denounced the Gang of Four in 1976, he continued to invoke Mao's name to justify Mao-era policies.  Hua spearheaded what became known as the Two Whatevers, namely, "Whatever policy originated from Chairman Mao, we must continue to support," and "Whatever directions were given to us from Chairman Mao, we must continue to follow." Like Deng, Hua wanted to reverse the damage of the Cultural Revolution; but unlike Deng, who wanted to propose new economic models for China, Hua intended to move the Chinese economic and political system towards Soviet-style planning of the early 1950s.

It became increasingly clear to Hua that, without Deng Xiaoping, it was difficult to continue daily affairs of state. On October 10, Deng Xiaoping personally wrote a letter to Hua asking to be transferred back to state and party affairs; party elders also called for Deng's return. With increasing pressure from all sides, Premier Hua named Deng Vice-Premier in July 1977, and later promoted him to various other positions, effectively catapulting Deng to China's second-most powerful figure. In August, the 11th National Congress of the Chinese Communist Party was held in Beijing, officially naming (in ranking order) Hua Guofeng, Ye Jianying, Deng Xiaoping, Li Xiannian and Wang Dongxing as new members of the Politburo Standing Committee.

Repudiation of the Cultural Revolution by Deng

Deng Xiaoping first proposed the idea of "Boluan Fanzheng" in September 1977 in order to correct the mistakes of Cultural Revolution. In May 1978, Deng seized the opportunity to elevate his protégé Hu Yaobang to power. Hu published an article in the Guangming Daily, making clever use of Mao's quotations while lauding Deng's ideas. Following this article, Hua began to shift his tone in support of Deng. On July 1, Deng publicized Mao's self-criticism report of 1962 regarding the failure of the Great Leap Forward. With an expanding power base, in September 1978, Deng began openly attacking Hua Guofeng's "Two Whatevers".

On December 18, 1978, the pivotal Third Plenum of the 11th Central Committee was held. At the congress, Deng called for "a liberation of thoughts" and urged the party to "seek truth from facts" and abandon ideological dogma. The Plenum officially marked the beginning of the economic reform era, with Deng becoming the second paramount leader of China. Hua Guofeng engaged in self-criticism and called his "Two Whatevers" a mistake. Wang Dongxing, a trusted ally of Mao, was also criticized. At the Plenum, the Party reversed its verdict on the Tiananmen Incident. Disgraced former Chinese president Liu Shaoqi was allowed a belated state funeral. Peng Dehuai, one of China's ten marshals and the first Minister of National Defense, was persecuted to death during the Cultural Revolution; he was politically rehabilitated in 1978.

At the Fifth Plenum held in 1980, Peng Zhen, He Long and other leaders who had been purged during the Cultural Revolution were politically rehabilitated. Hu Yaobang became head of the Secretariat of the Chinese Communist Party as its Secretary-general. In September, Hua Guofeng resigned and Zhao Ziyang, another Deng ally, was named Premier of China. Deng remained the Chairman of the Central Military Commission, but formal power was transferred to a new generation of pragmatic reformers, who reversed Cultural Revolution policies to a large extent during the Boluan Fanzheng period. Within a few years from 1978, Deng Xiaoping and Hu Yaobang helped rehabilitate over 3 million "unjust, false, erroneous" cases in Cultural Revolution. In particular, the trial of the Gang of Four took place in Beijing from 1980 to 1981, and the court stated that 729,511 people had been persecuted by the Gang, of whom 34,800 were said to have died.

In 1981, the Chinese Communist Party passed a resolution and declared that the Cultural Revolution was "responsible for the most severe setback and the heaviest losses suffered by the Party, the country, and the people since the founding of the People's Republic."

Humanitarian crisis

Death toll

Death toll estimates from different sources vary greatly, ranging from hundreds of thousands to 20 million. In addition, the 1975 Banqiao Dam failure, considered by some as the world's greatest technological catastrophe of the 20th century, resulted in an estimated death toll between 26,600 and 240,000; the disaster, which took place during the Cultural Revolution, was covered up until at least 1989.

Most deaths arose after the end of the mass movement phase of the Cultural Revolution when there were organized campaigns to consolidate order in workplaces and communities. As Walder summarizes, "[T]he cure for factional warfare was far worse than the disease."

Literature reviews of the overall death toll due to the Cultural Revolution usually include the following.

Massacres and cannibalism 

During the Cultural Revolution, massacres took place across mainland China, including:
 the Guangxi Massacre, in which massive cannibalism occurred;
 the Inner Mongolia incident;
 the Guangdong Massacre;
 the Yunnan Massacres;
 the Hunan Massacres;
 the Beijing Massacre (i.e. Red August); and
 the Ruijin Massacre.

These massacres were mainly led and organized by local revolutionary committees, Communist Party branches, militia, and even the military. Most of the victims in the massacres were members of the Five Black Categories as well as their children, or members of the "rebel groups". Chinese scholars have estimated that at least 300,000 people died in these massacres. Collective killings in Guangxi Province and Guangdong Province were among the most serious. In Guangxi, the official annals of at least 43 counties have records of massacres, with 15 of them reporting a death toll of over 1,000, while in Guangdong at least 28 county annals record massacres, with 6 of them reporting a death toll of over 1,000.
 In the Guangxi Massacre, the official record shows an estimated death toll from 100,000 to 150,000. According to Mao: The Unknown Story, an estimated 100,000 people died in one of the worst violent struggles in Guangxi between January and April 1968, before Premier Zhou Enlai sent the PLA to intervene. Zheng Yi's Scarlet Memorial: Tales of Cannibalism in Modern China alleged that "systematic killing and cannibalization of individuals in the name of political revolution and 'class struggle' among the Zhuang people in Wuxuan County during that period. Zheng was criticized in China for reliance on unpublished interviews and for the negative portrayal of a Chinese ethnic minority, although senior party historians corroborated allegations of cannibalism.
 In Shadian incident of Yunnan, massacre targeting Hui people led by the PLA in 1975 resulted in the deaths of more than 1,600 civilians, including 300 children, and destroyed 4,400 homes.
 In Daoxian Massacre of Hunan, from August 13 to October 17, 1967, a total of 7,696 people were killed, 1,397 people were forced to commit suicide, and 2,146 people were permanently disabled.
 In Beijing massacre (Red August), official sources in 1980 have revealed that at least 1,772 people were killed by Red Guards from August to September 1966, including teachers and principals of many schools; in addition, 33,695 homes were ransacked and 85,196 families were forced to leave the city. In particular, the Daxing Massacre caused the deaths of 325 people from August 27 to September 1, 1966; the oldest killed was 80 years old and the youngest was only 38 days old, while 22 families were wiped out.

Violent Struggles, Struggle sessions, and purges 

Violent Struggles, or Wudou, were factional conflicts (mostly among Red Guards and "rebel groups") which began in Shanghai and then spread to other areas of China in 1967. It brought the country to the state of civil war. Weapons used in armed conflicts included some 18.77 million guns (some claim 1.877 million), 2.72 million grenades, 14,828 cannons, millions of other ammunitions and even armored cars as well as tanks. Notable violent struggles include the battles in Chongqing, in Sichuan, and in Xuzhou. Researchers have pointed out that the nationwide death toll in violent struggles ranges from 300,000 to 500,000.

The incidence of violence rose in 1967, reaching a peak in summer of 1967 before dropping suddenly. During 1967, casualties were relatively low as weapons used during violent struggles were primarily clubs, spears, and rocks until late July. Although firearms and heavier weapons began to spread among the combatants during summer, most combatants at that time were neither trained nor committed fighters and therefore casualties remained relatively low. The peak of collective violence in summer 1967 dropped sharply after August, when Mao became concerned about rebel attacks on local army units and thereafter made clear that his prior calls to "drag out" army commanders was a mistake and he would instead support besieged army commands.

The greatest number of casualties occurred with the process of restoring order in 1968, although the overall number of violent conflicts was lower. Academic Andrew G. Walder states that while "rising casualties from a smaller number of insurgent conflicts surely reflected the increasing scale and organizational coherence of rebel factions, and their growing access to military weaponry[,]" another important factor was that "[t]he longer that local factional warfare continued without the prospect of an equitable political settlement, the greater the stakes for the participants and the more intense the collective violence as factions fought to avoid the consequence of losing.".

In addition to violent struggles, millions of people in China were violently persecuted, especially in the struggle sessions. Those identified as spies, "running dogs," "revisionists," or coming from a suspect class (including those related to former landlords or rich peasants) were subject to beating, imprisonment, rape, torture, sustained and systematic harassment and abuse, seizure of property, denial of medical attention, and erasure of social identity. Intellectuals were also targeted. Many survivors and observers suggest that almost anyone with skills over that of the average person was made the target of political "struggle" in some way.

At least hundreds of thousands of people were murdered, starved, or worked to death. Millions more were forcibly displaced. Young people from the cities were forcibly moved to the countryside, where they were forced to abandon all forms of standard education in place of the propaganda teachings of the CCP.

Some people were not able to stand the torture and, losing hope for the future, committed suicide. Researchers have pointed out that at least 100,000 to 200,000 people committed suicides during the early Cultural Revolution. One of the most famous cases of attempted suicide due to political persecution involved Deng Xiaoping's son, Deng Pufang, who jumped (or was thrown) from a four-story building after being "interrogated" by Red Guards. Instead of dying, he developed paraplegia.

At the same time, a large number of "unjust, false, mistaken cases" appeared due to political purges. In addition to those who died in massacres, a large number of people died or permanently disabled due to lynching or other forms of persecution. From 1968 to 1969, the "Cleansing the Class Ranks", a massive political purge launched by Mao, caused the deaths of at least 500,000 people. Purges of similar nature such as the "One Strike-Three Anti Campaign" and the "Campaign towards the May Sixteenth elements" were launched subsequently in the 1970s.

In Inner Mongolia incident, official sources in 1980 stated that 346,000 people were wrongly arrested, over 16,000 were persecuted to death or executed, and over 81,000 were permanently disabled. However, academics have estimated a death toll between 20,000 and 100,000.

In the Zhao Jianmin Spy Case of Yunnan, more than 1.387 million people were implicated and persecuted, which accounted for 6% of the total population of Yunnan at the time. From 1968 to 1969, more than 17,000 people died in massacres and 61,000 people were crippled for life; in Kunming (the capital city of Yunnan) alone, 1,473 people were killed and 9,661 people were permanently disabled.

In the Li Chuli case of Hebei, Li, the former deputy director of Organization Department of the Chinese Communist Party, was purged in 1968 and implicated around 80,000 people, 2,955 of whom were persecuted to death.

Ethnic minorities 

The Cultural Revolution wreaked much havoc on minority cultures and ethnicities in China. In Inner Mongolia, some 790,000 people were persecuted during the Inner Mongolia incident. Of these, 22,900 were beaten to death, and 120,000 were maimed, during a witch hunt to find members of the alleged separatist New Inner Mongolian People's Revolutionary Party. In Xinjiang, copies of the Qur'an and other books of the Uyghur people were apparently burned. Muslim imams reportedly were paraded around with paint splashed on their bodies.

In the ethnic Korean areas of northeast China, language schools were destroyed. In Yunnan Province, the palace of the Dai people's king was torched, and a massacre of Muslim Hui people at the hands of the PLA in Yunnan, known as the Shadian incident, reportedly claimed over 1,600 lives in 1975.  After the Cultural Revolution was over, the government gave reparations for the Shadian Incident, including the erection of a Martyr's Memorial in Shadian.

Concessions given to minorities were abolished during the Cultural Revolution as part of the Red Guards' attack on the "Four Olds". People's communes, previously only established in parts of Tibet, were established throughout Tibetan Autonomous Region in 1966, removing Tibet's exemption from China's period of land reform, and reimposed in other minority areas.  The effect on Tibet had been particularly severe as it came following the repression after the 1959 Tibetan uprising. The destruction of nearly all of its over 6,000 monasteries, which began before the Cultural Revolution, were often conducted with the complicity of local ethnic Tibetan Red Guards. Only eight were left intact by the end of the 1970s.

Many monks and nuns were killed, and the general population were subjected to physical and psychological torture. There were an estimated 600,000 monks and nuns in Tibet in 1950, and by 1979, most of them were dead, imprisoned or had disappeared. The Tibetan government in exile claimed that many Tibetans also died from famines in 1961–1964 and 1968–1973 as a result of forced collectivization, however the number of Tibetan deaths or whether famines, in fact, took place in these periods is disputed. Despite official persecution, some local leaders and minority ethnic practices survived in remote regions.

The overall failure of the Red Guards' and radical assimilationists' goals was mostly due to two factors. It was felt that pushing minority groups too hard would compromise China's border defences. This was especially important as minorities make up a large percentage of the population that live along China's borders. In the late 1960s, China experienced a period of strained relations with some of its neighbours, notably with the Soviet Union and India.  Many of the Cultural Revolution's goals in minority areas were simply too unreasonable to be implemented. The return to pluralism, and therefore the end of the worst of the effects of the Cultural Revolution on ethnic minorities in China, coincides closely with Lin Biao's removal from power.

Rape and sexual abuse 
Academic Pan Suiming writes that rape and sexual abuse of women were common during the height of the Cultural Revolution. Tania Branigan also writes in Red Memory: Living, Remembering and Forgetting China's Cultural Revolution that women raped tend to be from educated urban backgrounds while their rapists were poor peasants or local officials.

Cultural impact and influence

Red Guards riot 

The effects of the Cultural Revolution directly or indirectly touched essentially all of China's population. During the Cultural Revolution, much economic activity was halted, with "revolution", regardless of interpretation, being the primary objective of the country. Mao Zedong Thought became the central operative guide to all things in China. The authority of the Red Guards surpassed that of the PLA, local police authorities, and the law in general. Chinese traditional arts and ideas were ignored and publicly attacked, with praise for Mao being practiced in their place. People were encouraged to criticize cultural institutions and to question their parents and teachers, which had been strictly forbidden in traditional Chinese culture.

The start of the Cultural Revolution brought huge numbers of Red Guards to Beijing, with all expenses paid by the government, and the railway system was in turmoil. The revolution aimed to destroy the "Four Olds" (i.e., old customs, old culture, old habits, and old ideas) and establish the corresponding "Four News", which could range from changing of names and cutting of hair to the ransacking of homes, vandalizing cultural treasures, and desecrating temples. In a few years, countless ancient buildings, artifacts, antiques, books, and paintings were destroyed by Red Guards. The status of traditional Chinese culture and institutions within China was also severely damaged as a result of the Cultural Revolution, and the practice of many traditional customs weakened.

The revolution also aimed to "sweep away" all "cow demons and snake spirits", that is, all the class enemies who promoted bourgeois ideas within the party, the government, the army, among the intellectuals, as well as those from an exploitative family background or who belonged to one of the Five Black Categories. Large numbers of people perceived to be "monsters and demons" regardless of guilt or innocence were publicly denounced, humiliated, and beaten. In their revolutionary fervor, students especially the Red Guards denounced their teachers, and children denounced their parents. Many died through their ill-treatment or committed suicide. In 1968, youths were mobilized to go to the countryside in the Down to the Countryside Movement so they may learn from the peasantry, and the departure of millions from the cities helped end the most violent phase of the Cultural Revolution.

Academics and education 

Academics and intellectuals were regarded as the "Stinking Old Ninth" and were widely persecuted. Many were sent to rural labor camps such as the May Seventh Cadre School. According to the official documents in the prosecution of the Gang of Four, 142,000 cadres and teachers in the education circles were persecuted. Noted academics, scientists, and educators who died included Xiong Qinglai, Jian Bozan, Wu Han, Rao Yutai, Wu Dingliang, Yao Tongbin and Zhao Jiuzhang. As of 1968, among the 171 senior members who worked at the headquarters of Chinese Academy of Sciences in Beijing, 131 were persecuted. Among all the members of the academy in China, 229 were persecuted to death.

As of September 1971, more than 4,000 staff members of China's nuclear center in Qinghai were persecuted. More than 310 of them were permanently disabled, over 40 people committed suicide, and 5 were executed. During the Cultural Revolution, Chinese scientists still managed to successfully test the first missile, create the first hydrogen bomb and launch the first satellite in the Two Bombs, One Satellite program. There were also very significant achievements in both science and technology. These achievements laid the ground for further development in the post-Mao years.

In the early months of the Cultural Revolution, schools and universities were closed. Primary and middle schools later gradually reopened, but all colleges and universities were closed until 1970, and most universities did not reopen until 1972. The university entrance exams were cancelled after 1966, to be replaced later by a system whereby students were recommended by factories, villages and military units, and entrance exams were not restored until 1977 under Deng Xiaoping. Values taught in traditional education were abandoned.

During the Cultural Revolution, basic education was emphasized and rapidly expanded. While the years of schooling were reduced and education standard fell, the proportion of Chinese children who had completed primary education increased from less than half before the Cultural Revolution to almost all after the Cultural Revolution, and those who completed junior middle school rose from 15% to over two-third. The educational opportunities for rural children expanded considerably, while those of the children of the urban elite became restricted by the anti-elitist policies.

In 1968, the Communist Party instituted the Down to the Countryside Movement, in which "Educated Youths" (zhishi qingnian or simply zhiqing) in urban areas were sent to live and work in agrarian areas to be re-educated by the peasantry and to better understand the role of manual agrarian labor in Chinese society. In the initial stages, most of the youth who took part volunteered. Later on, the government resorted to forcing many of them to move. Between 1968 and 1979, 17 millions of China's urban youth left for the countryside. Being in the rural areas also deprived them the opportunity of higher education. The entire generation of tormented and inadequately educated individuals is often referred to as the 'lost generation' in both China and the West. In the post-Mao period, many of those forcibly moved attacked the policy as a violation of their human rights."

The impact of the Cultural Revolution on accessible education varied among regions, and formal measurements of literacy did not resume until the 1980s.  Some counties in Zhanjiang had illiteracy rates as high as 41% some 20 years after the revolution. The leaders of China at the time denied that there were any illiteracy problems from the start.  This effect was amplified by the elimination of qualified teachers—many districts were forced to rely on selected students to educate the next generation.

Though the effect of the Cultural Revolution was disastrous for millions in China, there were positive outcomes for some sections of the population, such as those in rural areas.  For example, the upheavals of the Cultural Revolution and the hostility to the intellectual elite is widely accepted to have damaged the quality of education in China, especially at the upper end of the education system.  The radical policies provided many in rural communities with middle school education for the first time, which is thought to have facilitated the rural economic development in the 70s and 80s.

Similarly, many health personnel were deployed to the countryside as barefoot doctors during the Cultural Revolution. Some farmers were given informal medical training, and health-care centers were established in rural communities. This process led to a marked improvement in the health and the life expectancy of the general population.

Slogans and rhetoric

According to Shaorong Huang, the fact that the Cultural Revolution had such massive effects on Chinese society is the result of extensive use of political slogans. In Huang's view, rhetoric played a central role in rallying both the Party leadership and people at large during the Cultural Revolution. For example, the slogan "to rebel is justified" became a unitary theme.

Huang asserts that political slogans were ubiquitous in every aspect of people's lives, being printed onto everyday items such as bus tickets, cigarette packets, and mirror tables. Workers were supposed to "grasp revolution and promote productions", while peasants were supposed to raise more pigs because "more pigs means more manure, and more manure means more grain." Even a casual remark by Mao, "Sweet potato tastes good; I like it" became a slogan everywhere in the countryside.

Political slogans of the time had three sources: Mao, official Party media such as People's Daily, and the Red Guards.  Mao often offered vague, yet powerful directives that led to the factionalization of the Red Guards. These directives could be interpreted to suit personal interests, in turn aiding factions' goals in being most loyal to Mao Zedong. Red Guard slogans were of the most violent nature, such as "Strike the enemy down on the floor and step on him with a foot", "Long live the red terror!" and "Those who are against Chairman Mao will have their dog skulls smashed into pieces."

Sinologists Lowell Dittmer and Chen Ruoxi point out that the Chinese language had historically been defined by subtlety, delicacy, moderation, and honesty, as well as the "cultivation of a refined and elegant literary style." This changed during the Cultural Revolution. Since Mao wanted an army of bellicose people in his crusade, rhetoric at the time was reduced to militant and violent vocabulary. These slogans were a powerful and effective method of "thought reform," mobilizing millions in a concerted attack upon the subjective world, "while at the same time reforming their objective world."

Dittmer and Chen argue that the emphasis on politics made language a very effective form of propaganda, but "also transformed it into a jargon of stereotypes—pompous, repetitive, and boring." To distance itself from the era, Deng Xiaoping's government cut back heavily on the use of political slogans. During a eulogy for Deng's death, Jiang Zemin called the cultural revolution a "grave mistake."

Arts and literature

Drastic changes in art and culture took place during the Cultural Revolution. Before this period, few Chinese cultural productions reflected the lives of peasants and workers. As part of the Cultural Revolution, the struggles of workers, peasants, and revolutionary soldiers became frequent artistic subjects, often created by peasants and workers themselves. The spread of peasant paintings in rural China, for example, became one of the "newborn things" said to arise in a socialist society. In poor and remote areas of China, movies and operas were shown for free. Mobile film units brought the cinema to the countryside and were crucial to the standardization and popularization of cultural during this period, particularly including revolutionary model operas.

During the Cultural Revolution, Jiang Qing took control of the stage and introduced the revolutionary model operas under her direct supervision. Traditional operas were banned as they were considered feudalistic and bourgeois, but revolutionary opera, which is based on Peking opera but modified in both content and form, was promoted. Starting in 1967, eight model dramas (six operas and two ballets) were produced in the first three years, and the most notable of the operas was The Legend of the Red Lantern.  These operas were the only approved opera form. Other opera troupes were required to adopt or change their repertoire.

The model operas were broadcast on the radio, made into films, blared from public loudspeakers, taught to students in schools and workers in factories, and became ubiquitous as a form of popular entertainment and the only theatrical entertainment for millions in China. Most of the model dramas featured women as their title characters and promoted China's policies of state feminism. The narratives of these women protagonists begin with them oppressed by misogyny, class position, and imperialism before liberating themselves through the discovery of internal strength and the Communist Party.

In 1966, Jiang Qing put forward the Theory of the Dictatorship of the Black Line in Literature and Arts where those perceived to be bourgeois, anti-socialist or anti-Mao "black line" should be cast aside, and called for the creation of new literature and arts. Writers, artists and intellectuals who were the recipients and disseminators of the "old culture" would be comprehensively eradicated. The majority of writers and artists were seen as "black line figures" and "reactionary literati", and therefore persecuted, many were subjected to "criticism and denunciation" where they may be publicly humiliated and ravaged, and may also be imprisoned or sent to be reformed through hard labour. For instance, Mei Zhi and her husband were sent to a tea farm in Lushan County, Sichuan, and she did not resume writing until the 1980s.

Documents released in 1980 regarding the prosecution of the Gang of Four show more than 2,600 people in the field of arts and literature were revealed to have been persecuted by the Ministry of Culture and units under it alone. Many died as a result of their ordeal and humiliation—the names of 200 well-known writers and artists who were persecuted to death during the Cultural Revolution were commemorated in 1979, these include writers such as Lao She, Fu Lei, Deng Tuo, Baren, Li Guangtian, Yang Shuo and Zhao Shuli.

During the Cultural Revolution, only a few writers who gained permission or requalification under the new system, such as Hao Ran and some writers of worker or farmer background, can have had their work published or reprinted. The principles for cultural production laid out by Mao in the 1942 "Talks at the Yan'an Forum on Art and Literature" became dogmatized during the Cultural Revolution. The literary situation eased after 1972, more writers were allowed to write, and many provincial literary periodicals resumed publication, but the majority of writers still could not work.

The effect is similar in the film industry. A booklet titled "Four Hundred Films to be Criticized" was distributed, and film directors and actors/actresses were criticized with some tortured and imprisoned. These included many of Jiang Qing's rivals and former friends in the film industry, and those who died in the period included Cai Chusheng, Zheng Junli, Shangguan Yunzhu, Wang Ying, and Xu Lai.  No feature films were produced in mainland China for seven years apart from the few approved "Model dramas" and highly ideological films, a notable example of the handful of films made and permitted to be shown in this period is Taking Tiger Mountain by Strategy.

Revolution-themed songs instead were promoted during the Cultural Revolution, and songs such as "Ode to the Motherland", "Sailing the Seas Depends on the Helmsman", "The East Is Red" and "Without the Communist Party, There Would Be No New China" were either written or became extremely popular during this period. "The East Is Red", especially, became popular; it de facto supplanted "March of the Volunteers" as the national anthem of China, though the latter was restored to its previous place after the Cultural Revolution ended.

Quotation songs, in which Mao's quotations were set to music, were particularly popular during the early years of the Cultural Revolution. Records of quotation songs were well-suited to being played over loudspeakers, which were their intended primary means of broadcast as the use of transistor radios lagged in China until 1976. "Rusticated youths" with an interest in broadcast technology frequently operated the rural radio stations after 1968.

Propaganda art

Some of the most enduring images of the Cultural Revolution come from poster arts. Propaganda art in posters was used as a campaigning tool and mass communication device and often served as the leading source of information for the people. They were produced in large number and widely disseminated, and were used by the government and Red Guards to educate the public the ideological value as defined by the party state. There were many types of posters, the two main genres being the big-character poster and "commercial" propaganda poster.

The dazibao may be slogans, poems, commentary and graphics often freely created and posted on walls in public spaces, factories and communes. They were vital to Mao's struggle in the Cultural Revolution, and Mao himself wrote his own dazibao at Beijing University on August 5, 1966, calling on the people to "Bombard the Headquarters."

The xuanchuanhua were artworks produced by the government and sold cheaply in stores to be displayed in homes or workplaces. The artists for these posters might be amateurs or uncredited professionals, and the posters were largely in a Socialist Realist visual style with certain conventions—for example, images of Mao were to be depicted as "red, smooth, and luminescent".

Traditional themes in art were sidelined the Cultural Revolution, and artists such as Feng Zikai, Shi Lu, and Pan Tianshou were persecuted. Many of the artists have been assigned to manual labour, and artists were expected to depict subjects that glorified the Cultural Revolution related to their labour. In 1971, in part to alleviate their suffering, several leading artists were recalled from manual labour or free from captivity under the initiative of Zhou Enlai to decorate hotels and railway stations defaced by Red Guards slogans.  Zhou said that the artworks were for meant for foreigners, therefore were "outer" art not be under the obligations and restrictions placed on "inner" art meant for Chinese citizens. To him, landscape paintings should also not be considered one of the "Four Olds". However, Zhou was weakened by cancer, and in 1974, the Jiang Qing faction seized these and other paintings and mounted exhibitions in Beijing, Shanghai and other cities denouncing the artworks as "Black Paintings".

Historical relics

China's historical sites, artifacts and archives suffered devastating damage, as they were thought to be at the root of "old ways of thinking." Artifacts were seized, museums and private homes ransacked, and any item found that was thought to represent bourgeois or feudal ideas was destroyed. There are few records of exactly how much was destroyed—Western observers suggest that much of China's thousands of years of history was in effect destroyed, or, later, smuggled abroad for sale, during the short ten years of the Cultural Revolution. Chinese historians compare the cultural suppression during the Cultural Revolution to Qin Shihuang's great Confucian purge. Religious persecution intensified during this period, as a result of religion being viewed in opposition to Marxist–Leninist and Maoist thinking.

Although being undertaken by some of the Revolution's enthusiastic followers, the destruction of historical relics was never formally sanctioned by the Communist Party, whose official policy was instead to protect such items. On May 14, 1967, the CCP central committee issued a document entitled Several suggestions for the protection of cultural relics and books during the Cultural Revolution. Nevertheless, enormous damage was inflicted on China's cultural heritage. For example, a survey in 1972 in Beijing of 18 key spots of cultural heritage, including the Temple of Heaven and Ming Tombs, showed extensive damage. Of the 80 cultural heritage sites in Beijing under municipal protection, 30 were destroyed, and of the 6,843 cultural sites under protection by Beijing government decision in 1958, 4,922 were damaged or destroyed. Numerous valuable old books, paintings, and other cultural relics were also burnt to ashes.

Later archaeological excavation and preservation after the destructive period in the 1960s, however, were protected, and several significant discoveries, such as the Terracotta Army and the Mawangdui, occurred after the peak of the Revolution. Nevertheless, the most prominent symbol of academic research in archaeology, the journal Kaogu, did not publish during the Cultural Revolution. After the most violent phase of the 1960s ended, the attack on traditional culture continued in 1973 with the Anti-Lin Biao, Anti-Confucius Campaign as part of the struggle against the moderate elements in the party.

Foreign relations 

During the Cultural Revolution, the Communist China exported the "Communist Revolution" as well as the Communist ideology to multiple countries in Southeast Asia, supporting the communist parties in Indonesia, Malaysia, Vietnam, Laos, Myanmar and in particular, the Khmer Rouge in Cambodia which was responsible for the Cambodian genocide. It is estimated that at least 90% of the foreign aid to the Khmer Rouge came from China, with 1975 alone seeing at least US$1 billion in interest-free economic and military aid and US$20 million gift from China. The economic malaise that resulted from the Cultural Revolution impacted China's ability to assist North Vietnam in its war against South Vietnam by the 1970s, which resulted in a cooling of relations between the once allied nations.

Among the over 40 countries which had established diplomatic or half-diplomatic relations with China at the time, around 30 countries went into diplomatic disputes with China—some countries even terminated their diplomatic relations with China, including Central Africa, Ghana and Indonesia.
 Red Guards break into the British Legation in Beijing and assault three diplomats and a secretary, before setting it ablaze. The PRC authorities refuse to condemn the action. British officials in Shanghai were attacked in a separate incident, as the PRC authorities attempted to close the office there.
 Red Guards also laid siege to the Soviet, French and Indonesian embassies and torched the Mongolian ambassador's car.
 With the help of Chinese embassies and consulates overseas, the CCP launched various propaganda campaigns for Mao, such as sending the Little Red Book and the Chairman Mao badge to local citizens.
 Many of Chinese ambassadors and consuls were called back to China to engage in the Cultural Revolution. Senior officials such as Chen Yi,  the 2nd Foreign Minister of the People's Republic of China, were persecuted.
 Several foreign guests were "mandated" to stand in front of the statue of Mao Zedong, holding the Little Red Book and "reporting" to Mao as other Chinese citizens did.

Public views

Communist Party opinions

To make sense of the mass chaos caused by Mao's leadership in the Cultural Revolution while preserving the CCP's authority and legitimacy, Mao's successors needed to lend the event a "proper" historical judgment. On June 27, 1981, the Central Committee adopted the "Resolution on Certain Questions in the History of Our Party Since the Founding of the People's Republic of China," an official assessment of major historical events since 1949. This document became the key event in the official interpretation of the Cultural Revolution period.

The Resolution frankly noted Mao's leadership role in the movement, stating that "chief responsibility for the grave 'Left' error of the 'Cultural Revolution,' an error comprehensive in magnitude and protracted in duration, does indeed lie with Comrade Mao Zedong." It diluted blame on Mao himself by asserting that the movement was "manipulated by the counterrevolutionary groups of Lin Biao and Jiang Qing," who caused its worst excesses. The Resolution affirmed that the Cultural Revolution "brought serious disaster and turmoil to the Communist Party and the Chinese people." These themes of "turmoil" and "disaster" have become "master trope[s]" in both historical and popular understanding of the Cultural Revolution.

The official view aimed to separate Mao's actions during the Cultural Revolution from his "heroic" revolutionary activities during the Chinese Civil War and the Second Sino-Japanese War. It also separated Mao's personal mistakes from the correctness of the theory that he created, going as far as to rationalize that the Cultural Revolution contravened the spirit of Mao Zedong Thought, which remains an official guiding ideology of the CCP. Deng Xiaoping famously summed this up with the phrase "Mao was 70% good, 30% bad."  After the Cultural Revolution, Deng affirmed that Maoist ideology was responsible for the revolutionary success of the Communist Party, but abandoned it in practice to favour "Socialism with Chinese characteristics", a very different model of state-directed market economics.

CCP historiography characterizes the Cultural Revolution as an aberration and a period of chaos across all sectors of Chinese society. In China, the official view of the party now serves as the dominant framework for historiography of the period; alternative views (see below) are discouraged. Following the Cultural Revolution, a new genre of literature known as "Scar literature" (Shanghen Wenxue) emerged, being encouraged by the post-Mao government. Written mainly by educated youth such as Liu Xinhua, Zhang Xianliang, and Liu Xinwu, scar literature depicted the Revolution from a negative viewpoint, using their own perspectives and experiences as a basis.

After the 1989 Tiananmen Square protests and massacre, both liberals and conservatives within the CCP accused each other of excesses that they claimed were reminiscent of the Cultural Revolution. Li Peng, who promoted the use of military force, cited that the student movement had taken inspiration from the grassroots populism of the Cultural Revolution and that if it is left unchecked, would eventually lead to a similar degree of mass chaos. Zhao Ziyang, who was sympathetic to the protestors, later accused his political opponents of illegally removing him from office by using "Cultural Revolution-style" tactics, including "reversing black and white, exaggerating personal offenses, taking quotes out of context, issuing slander and lies ... inundating the newspapers with critical articles making me out to be an enemy, and casual disregard for my personal freedoms."

Alternative opinions in China
Although the Chinese Communist Party officially condemns the Cultural Revolution, there are many Chinese people who hold more positive views of it, particularly amongst the working class, who benefited most from its policies. People in rural areas of China also tend to view the Cultural Revolution in a more positive light given the expansion of rural infrastructure and agricultural development that occurred during the period. Since Deng's ascendancy to power, the government has arrested and imprisoned figures who have taken a strongly pro-Cultural Revolution stance. For instance, in 1985, a young shoe-factory worker put up a poster on a factory wall in Xianyang, Shaanxi, which declared that "The Cultural Revolution was Good" and led to achievements such as "the building of the Nanjing Yangtze River Bridge, the creation of hybrid rice crops and the rise of people's consciousness." The factory worker was eventually sentenced to ten years in prison, where he died soon after "without any apparent cause." Since the late 1980s, China has experienced "at first a fitful and then a nationwide revival in Mao Zedong," including aspects of the Cultural Revolution.

One of the student leaders of the 1989 Tiananmen Square protests, Shen Tong, author of Almost a Revolution, has a positive view of some aspects of the Cultural Revolution. According to Shen, the trigger for the famous Tiananmen hunger-strikes of 1989 was a big-character poster (dazibao), a form of public political discussion that gained prominence during the Cultural Revolution. Shen remarked that the congregation of students from across the country to Beijing on trains and the hospitality they received from residents was reminiscent of the experiences of Red Guards in the Cultural Revolution.

Since the advent of the Internet, people inside and outside China have argued online that the Cultural Revolution had many beneficial qualities for China that have been denied by both the post-Mao Chinese Communist Party and Western media. Some hold that the Cultural Revolution 'cleansed' China from superstitions, religious dogma, and outdated traditions in a 'modernist transformation' that later made Deng's economic reforms possible. The popular revival of Mao in the late 1990s coincided with the government's increasing privatization and its dismantling of the iron rice bowl employment and welfare policies. These sentiments also increased following the U.S. bombing of the Chinese embassy in Belgrade in 1999 when a segment of the population began to associate anti-Maoist viewpoints with the United States.

Contemporary Maoists have also become more organized in the internet era, partially as a response to criticisms of Mao from academics and scholars. One Maoist website managed to collect thousands of signatures demanding punishment for those who publicly criticize Mao. Along with the call for legal action, this movement demands the establishment of agencies similar to Cultural Revolution-era "neighborhood committees", in which "citizens" would report anti-Maoists to local public security bureaus. Maoist rhetoric and mass mobilization methods were resurgent in the interior city of Chongqing during the political career of Bo Xilai.

In 2012, Chinese web portal and social media platform Tencent conducted an online survey focused on "how to combat the unhealthy trend of Cultural Revolution nostalgia." Seventy-eight percent of survey participants expressed nostalgia for the Cultural Revolution.

Contemporary China

Public discussion of the Cultural Revolution is still limited in China. The Chinese government continues to prohibit news organizations from mentioning details of the Cultural Revolution, and online discussions and books about the topic are subject to official scrutiny. Textbooks on the subject continue to abide by the "official view" (see above) of the events. Many government documents from the 1960s onward remain classified and are not open to formal inspection by private academics. At the National Museum of China in Beijing, the Cultural Revolution is barely mentioned in its historical exhibits. Despite inroads made by numerous prominent sinologists, independent scholarly research of the Cultural Revolution is discouraged by the Chinese government. There are concerns that as witnesses age and die, the opportunity to research the event thoroughly within China may be lost.

Contemporary discussions of Mao Zedong's legacy 
Mao Zedong's public image is one that is widely disputed among the nation of China. Despite his gruesome actions, during the anniversary of his birth, many people within China are left viewing Mao as a godlike figure and refer to him as "the people's great savior." Supporters of Mao Zedong hold him to the highest regard, that of a deity. Additionally, contemporary discussions in modern newspapers like the Global Times continue to make attempts to preserve Mao's public image. Rather than focus on the horrific consequences of his leadership, newspapers make excuses by describing that revolutions typically have a brutal side and are unable to be viewed from the "humanitarian perspective." Supporters of Mao would agree on the opinion that the ends justify the means.

Adversaries of Mao Zedong look at the actions that occurred under his leadership from a different point of view. An interesting way to look at Mao's public image is that "he was better at conquering power than at ruling the country and developing a socialist economy." It is clearly evident that Mao went to extreme measures to conquer power. However, despite successes in gaining power, it is obvious that Mao's actions had disastrous effects. Adversaries of Mao recognize that his actions were ill-conceived. In terms of his public image, they are also content with depicting him as innately evil. The benefits of Mao Zedong's rule do not exceed the countless lives lost within the nation. Millions of mothers, fathers, brothers, sisters, etc. of individuals were lost due to Mao's arrogance. It is clear that depending on who is asked, Mao Zedong's public image varies greatly.

Outside mainland China
In Hong Kong, a pro-Communist anti-colonial strike inspired by the Cultural Revolution was launched in 1967. Its excesses damaged the credibility of these activists for more than a generation in the eyes of Hong Kong residents.  In Taiwan, Chiang Kai-shek initiated the Chinese Cultural Renaissance to counter what he regarded as the destruction of traditional Chinese values by the Communists on the mainland. In Albania, Communist leader and Chinese ally Enver Hoxha began a "Cultural and Ideological Revolution" organized along the same lines as the Cultural Revolution.

In the world at large, Mao Zedong emerged as a symbol of the anti-establishment, grassroots populism, and self-determination. His revolutionary philosophies found adherents in the Shining Path of Peru, the Naxalite insurgency in India, various political movements in Nepal, the U.S.-based Black Panther Party, and the 1960s counterculture movement in general.

In October 1966, Enver Hoxha delivered a speech to a plenum of the CC of the Party of Labour titled "Some Preliminary Ideas about the Cultural Revolution" and analyzed it in an overall negative fashion. He said that "the cult of Mao was raised to the skies in a sickening and artificial manner" and added that, in reading of its purported objectives, "you have the impression that everything old in Chinese and world culture should be rejected without discrimination and a new culture, the culture they call proletarian, should be created." He further stated that, "It is difficult for us to call this revolution, as the 'Red Guards' are carrying it out, a Proletarian Cultural Revolution... the enemies could and should be captured by the organs of the dictatorship on the basis of the law, and if the enemies have wormed their way into the party committees, let them be purged through party channels. Or in the final analysis, arm the working class and attack the committees, but not with children."

In 2007 Hong Kong Chief Executive Donald Tsang remarked that the Cultural Revolution represented the 'dangers of democracy', remarking "People can go to the extreme like what we saw during the Cultural Revolution [...], when people take everything into their own hands, then you cannot govern the place." The remarks caused controversy in Hong Kong and were later retracted with an accompanying apology.

Academic debate
Scholars and academics continue to debate why events unfolded the way they did, Mao's role, how the Cultural Revolution began, and what it was. These debates have changed over the decades as researchers explored new sources. The Cultural Revolution does not lend itself to a single narrative storyline as it was a series of overlapping and internally complex movements.

In the 1960s, while many scholars dismissed Mao's initiatives as ideological and destructive, others sympathized with his concern for equality, opposition to bureaucratism and corruption, and individual selfishness. They saw Maoism as a populist insistence on mass participation, mass criticism and the right to rebel, and a determination to wipe out a new ruling class. By the 1980s, however, Harvard University sociologist Andrew Walder wrote that the "public opinion in the field had changed markedly". Most in the field now "seem convinced that the Cultural Revolution was a human disaster, even a historical crime, something on the order of Hitler's holocaust and Stalin's great terror."

Walder argued that the failures of the Cultural Revolution did not come from poor implementation, bureaucratic sabotage, disloyalty, or lingering class antagonisms. If things turned out differently from what Mao expected, Walder concluded, this was "probably due to the fact that Mao did not know what he wanted, or that he did know what he was doing, or both ... the outcomes are what one should have expected, given the Maoist doctrine and aims."

The debate continues because the movement contains many contradictions: led by an all-powerful omnipresent leader, it was mainly driven by a series of grassroots popular uprisings against the Communist establishment. Many English-language books published since the 1980s paint a negative picture of the movement. Historian Anne F. Thurston wrote that it "led to loss of culture, and of spiritual values; loss of hope and ideals; loss of time, truth and of life". Barnouin and Yu summarized the Cultural Revolution as "a political movement that produced unprecedented social divisions, mass mobilization, hysteria, upheavals, arbitrary cruelty, torture, killings, and even civil war", calling Mao "one of the most tyrannical despots of the twentieth century". According to historian Chun Lin, despite these human tragedies, there was also rapid expansion of individual freedoms and political self-organization during the Cultural Revolution.

Some scholars challenge the mainstream portrayals of the Cultural Revolution and offer to understand it in a more positive light. Mobo Gao, writing in The Battle for China's Past: Mao and the Cultural Revolution, argues that the movement benefited millions of Chinese citizens, particularly agricultural and industrial workers, and sees it as egalitarian and genuinely populist, citing continued Maoist nostalgia in China today as remnants of its positive legacy. Some draw a distinction between intention and performance. While Mao's leadership was pivotal at the beginning of the movement, Jin Qiu contends that as events progressed, it deviated significantly from Mao's utopian vision. In this sense, the Cultural Revolution was actually a much more decentralized and varied movement that gradually lost cohesion, spawning many 'local revolutions' which differed in their nature and goals.

Academic interest has also focused on the movement's relationship with Mao's personality. Mao envisioned himself as a wartime guerrilla leader, which made him wary of the bureaucratic nature of peacetime governance. With the Cultural Revolution Mao was simply "returning to form", once again taking on the role of a guerrilla leader fighting against an institutionalized party bureaucracy. Roderick MacFarquhar and Michael Schoenhals, paint the movement as neither a bona fide war over ideological purity nor a mere power struggle to remove Mao's political rivals.

While Mao's personal motivations were undoubtedly pivotal to the Cultural Revolution, they reasoned that other complex factors contributed to the way events unfolded. These include China's relationship with the global Communist movement, geopolitical concerns, the ideological rift between China and the Soviet Union, Khrushchev's ouster, and the failures of the Great Leap Forward. They conclude that the movement was, at least in part, a legacy project to cement Mao's place in history, aimed to boost his prestige while he was alive and preserve the invulnerability of his ideas after his death.

Varying academic focuses on power conflicts or clashes of personalities as underlying Mao's motivations, or alternatively on ideological reasons for launching the Cultural Revolution, are not necessarily conflicting.. Mao's suspicions of those around him in power also reflected his longstanding concerns with the decline of revolutionary spirit and the potential rise of a new class-stratified society arising as the popular revolutionary movement of the party transformed into a socialist bureaucracy to govern. Historian Rebecca Karl writes that for Mao, the pursuit of power was never an end in itself, but rather the seizure of state power was to be used in making the revolution.

Professor Yiching Wu argues that the typical historiography of the Cultural Revolution as an "era of madness" is simpleminded but writes that such narratives have a "remarkably tenacious ideological power:"

See also

 Chinese Cultural Renaissance
 List of campaigns of the Chinese Communist Party
 List of massacres in China
 Burning of books and burying of scholars, Qin dynasty
 Morning Sun (film)

International:
 Mass destruction of Japanese cultural heritage by the Japanese government in the late 19th century Meiji restoration
 July Theses, a mini–Cultural Revolution in Romania
 Cultural Revolution in the Soviet Union
 Mass killings under communist regimes

General:
 Iconoclasm
 List of destroyed heritage

Notes

References

Citations

Sources 

 "Li Peng, the 'Butcher of Tiananmen,' was 'Ready to Die' to Stop the Student Turmoil." AsiaNews. 2003. Retrieved August 21, 2011
 Barnouin, Barbara, and Yu Changgen. 2006. Zhou Enlai: A Political Life. Hong Kong: Chinese University of Hong Kong. . Retrieved on March 12, 2011
 Ewing, Kent. June 4, 2011. "Mao's Army on the Attack." Asia Times Online. Retrieved on June 16, 2011
 Fong Tak-ho. May 19, 2006. "Cultural Revolution? What Revolution?" Asia Times Online. Retrieved on June 15, 2011
 Gao, Mobo. 2008. The Battle for China's Past: Mao and the Cultural Revolution. London: Pluto Press. . Retrieved on September 2, 2012.
 King, Richard, ed. 2010. Art in Turmoil: The Chinese Cultural Revolution, 1966–76. University of British Columbia Press. 
 MacFarquhar, Roderick, and Michael Schoenhals. 2006. Mao's Last Revolution. Harvard University Press. .
 Spence, Jonathan D. 1999. The Search for Modern China. New York, NY: W.W. Norton and Company. .
 Teiwes, Frederick C., and Warren Sun. 2004. "The First Tiananmen Incident Revisited: Elite Politics and Crisis Management at the End of the Maoist Era." Pacific Affairs 77(2):211–35. .
 Thurston, Anne F. 1988. Enemies of the People: The Ordeal of Intellectuals in China's Great Cultural Revolution. Cambridge: Harvard University Press.
 Ziyang, Zhao. 2009. Prisoner of the State: The Secret Journal of Premier Zhao Ziyang, translated and edited by B. Pu, R. Chiang, and A. Ignatius. New York, NY: Simon & Schuster. .

Further reading

General

 Richard Curt Kraus (2012). The Cultural Revolution: A Very Short Introduction. New York: Oxford University Press, Very Short Introductions Series. xiv, 138 pp. 
 Morning Sun, "Bibliography," Morningsun.org Books and articles of General Readings and Selected Personal Narratives on the Cultural Revolution
 Yuan Gao, with Judith Polumbaum, Born Red: A Chronicle of the Cultural Revolution (Stanford, CA: Stanford University Press, 1987), an autobiography that includes experiences during the Cultural Revolution
 Ji-li Jiang, Red Scarf Girl: A Memoir of the Cultural Revolution (New York: HarperCollins, 1997)
 A Year In Upper Felicity, book chronicling a year in a rural Chinese village during the Cultural Revolution

Specific topics
 Chan, Anit (1985). Children of Mao: Personality Development and Political Activism in the Red Guard Generation. Seattle: University of Washington Press
 Chen, Lingchei Letty (2020). "The Great Leap Backward: Forgetting and Representing the Mao Years". New York: Cambria Press. Scholarly studies on memory writings and documentaries of the Mao years, victimhood narratives, perpetrator studies, ethics of bearing witness to atrocities
 Li, Jie and Enhua Zhang, eds. (2016).Red Legacies in China: Cultural Afterlives of the Communist Revolution Harvard University Asia Center, 409 pp.; Scholarly studies on cultural legacies and continuities from the Maoist era in art, architecture, literature, performance, film, etc.
 Fox Butterfield (1982, revised 2000). China: Alive in the Bitter Sea, an oral history of some Chinese people's experience during the Cultural Revolution
 Ross Terrill (1992). The White-Boned Demon: A Biography of Madame Mao Zedong  Stanford University Press, 1984 ; rpr. New York: Simon & Schuster, 
 Wu, Yiching (2014). The Cultural Revolution at the Margins: Chinese Socialism in Crisis. Cambridge, MA: Harvard University Press

Commentaries
 Ryckmans, Pierre (1977). The Chairman's New Clothes: Mao and the Cultural Revolution. 
 (revised ed.) 1981. 
 —— 1978. Chinese Shadows. 
 —— 1979. Broken Images: Essays on Chinese Culture and Politics. 
 —— 1986. The Burning Forest: Essays on Chinese Culture and Politics. 
 Liu, Guokai. 1987. A Brief Analysis of the Cultural Revolution. edited by Anita Chan. Armonk, NY: M. E. Sharpe

Fictional treatments
 Sijie, Dai (2001). Balzac and the Little Chinese Seamstress, translated by I. Rilke. New York: Knopf / Random House. 197 p. 
 Gao, Xingjian (2002). One Man's Bible: A Novel, translated by M. Lee. New York: HarperCollins. 450 pp
 Gu, Hua (1983). A Small Town Called Hibiscus, translated by G. Yang. Beijing: Chinese Literature / China Publications Centre. 260 p.
 Reprinted: San Francisco: China Books
 Yu, Hua (2003). To Live: A Novel, translated by M. Berry. New York: Anchor Books. 250 pp
 Compestine, Ying Chang (2007). Revolution Is Not a Dinner Party : A Novel. New York: Holt. . Young adult novel
 Cixin, Liu (2014). The Three-Body Problem, translated by K. Liu. New York: Tor Books.

Memoirs by Chinese participants
 Liu Ping, My Chinese Dream – From Red Guard to CEO (San Francisco, 2012). 556 p. 
 Nien Cheng, Life and Death in Shanghai  (Grove, May 1987). 547 p. 
 Jung Chang, Wild Swans: Three Daughters of China  (New York: Simon & Schuster,  1991). 524 p. 
 Heng Liang Judith Shapiro, Son of the Revolution (New York: Knopf : Distributed by Random House, 1983).
 Jiang Yang Chu translated and annotated by Djang Chu, Six Chapters of Life in a Cadre School: Memoirs from China's Cultural Revolution [Translation of Ganxiao Liu Ji] (Boulder: Westview Press,  1986).
 Ma Bo, Blood Red Sunset: A Memoir of the Chinese Cultural Revolution (New York: Viking, 1995). Translated by Howard Goldblatt.
 Guanlong Cao, The Attic: Memoir of a Chinese Landlord's Son (Berkeley: University of California Press,  1996).
 Anchee Min, Red Azalea (New York: Pantheon Books, 1994). .
 Rae Yang, Spider Eaters: A Memoir (Berkeley: University of California Press, 1997).
 Weili Ye, Xiaodong Ma, Growing up in the People's Republic: Conversations between Two Daughters of China's Revolution (New York: Palgrave Macmillan,  2005).
 Lijia Zhang, Socialism Is Great": A Worker's Memoir of the New China (New York: Atlas & Co, Distributed by Norton,  2007).
 Emily Wu, Feather in the Storm (Pantheon, 2006). .
 Xinran Xue, The Good Women of China: Hidden Voices  (Chatto & Windus, 2002). Translated by Esther Tyldesley. 
 Ting-Xing Ye, Leaf In A Bitter Wind (England, 1997)
 Dongping Han, The Unknown Cultural Revolution: Life and Change in a Chinese Village, 
 Ken Ling, The Revenge of Heaven. Journal of a young Chinese. English text prepared by Miriam London and Ta-Ling Lee. G. P. Putnam's Sons, New York 1972

Films set in the Cultural Revolution

 Xie Jin, Hibiscus Town (1984)
 Zhang Yimou, Red Sorghum (1987)
 Chen Kaige, Farewell My Concubine (1992)
 Zhang Yimou, Story of Qiu Ju (1992)
 Tian Zhuangzhuang Blue Kite (1993)
 Zhang Yimou, To Live (1993)
 Jiang Wen, In the Heat of the Sun (1994)

External links

 Encyclopædia Britannica. The Cultural Revolution
 History of The Cultural Revolution
 Chinese propaganda posters gallery (Cultural Revolution, Mao, and others)
 Hua Guofeng's speech to the 11th Party Congress, 1977
 Morning Sun – A Film and Website about Cultural Revolution and the photographs of the subject available from the film's site.
 Memorial for Victims of the Chinese Cultural Revolution
 "William Hinton on the Cultural Revolution" by Dave Pugh
 "Student Attacks Against Teachers: The Revolution of 1966" by Youqin Wang
 A Tale of Red Guards and Cannibals by Nicholas D. Kristof. The New York Times, January 6, 1993.

 
1960s in China
1970s in China
20th-century revolutions
Revolutions in China
Cultural history of China
Cold War history of China
Mao Zedong
Maoist terminology
Massacres in China
Politicides
Political and cultural purges
Political controversies in China
1966 establishments in China
1976 disestablishments in China
Campaigns of the Chinese Communist Party
1966 introductions
Man-made disasters in China
Vandalized works of art